The 1946 United States Senate special election in Virginia was held on November 5, 1946. Appointed Democratic Senator Thomas G. Burch retired after filling the vacancy caused by the death of Senator Carter Glass.  Absalom Willis Robertson defeated Republican Robert H. Woods and was elected to finish Glass's term in office.

Results

See also 
 1946 United States Senate elections

References

Virginia
Virginia 1946
1946
1946 Virginia elections
Virginia 1966
United States Senate 1966